Sir Charles Egerton was a 17th-century English politician.

He represented the seat of Ripon in Yorkshire between 1645 and December 1648, when he was removed in Pride's Purge.

References 

Year of birth missing
Year of death missing
English MPs 1640–1648